Illichivets-2 Mariupol is a defunct Ukrainian football team. It was the reserve team of the Ukrainian First League club FC Illichivets Mariupol. The club competed in the Druha Liha football competition of Ukraine.

History

When the Ukrainian Premier League created the Ukrainian Premier Reserve League there was an incentive for clubs to field their reserve clubs in the competition. Illichivets Mariupol still remain to field Illichivets-2 as their third team (juniors). However, after the complete of the 2011-12 Ukrainian Second League the club removed junior team and enter the newly formed  Ukrainian Premier League Under-19 competition.

The senior club was relegated from the Premier League in 2015 but still remain committed to the juniors school system. The club entered the team back into the Ukrainian Second League for the 2015–16 Ukrainian Second League season.

Honours and distinctions
 Ukrainian Premier League Reserves
 Winners: 2013–14

League and cup history

{|class="wikitable"
|-bgcolor="#efefef"
! Season
! Div.
! Pos.
! Pl.
! W
! D
! L
! GS
! GA
! P
!Domestic Cup
!colspan=2|Europe
!Notes
|-bgcolor=PowderBlue
|align=center|2000–01
|align=center|3rd "C"
|align=center|13
|align=center|30
|align=center|9
|align=center|7
|align=center|14
|align=center|32
|align=center|47
|align=center|34
|align=center|1/16 finalsSecond LeagueCup
|align=center|
|align=center|
|align=center|as Metalurh-2
|-bgcolor=PowderBlue
|align=center|2001–02
|align=center|3rd "C"
|align=center|14
|align=center|34
|align=center|8
|align=center|10
|align=center|16
|align=center|43
|align=center|59
|align=center|34
|align=center|
|align=center|
|align=center|
|align=center|as Metalurh-2
|-bgcolor=PowderBlue
|align=center|2002–03
|align=center|3rd "C"
|align=center|11
|align=center|28
|align=center|9
|align=center|3
|align=center|16
|align=center|24
|align=center|42
|align=center|30
|align=center|
|align=center|
|align=center|
|align=center|
|-bgcolor=PowderBlue
|align=center|2003–04
|align=center|3rd "C"
|align=center|9
|align=center|30
|align=center|11
|align=center|9
|align=center|10
|align=center|38
|align=center|40
|align=center|42
|align=center|
|align=center|
|align=center|
|align=center|
|-bgcolor=PowderBlue
|align=center|2004–05
|align=center|3rd "C"
|align=center|5
|align=center|28
|align=center|13
|align=center|4
|align=center|11
|align=center|49
|align=center|27
|align=center|43
|align=center|
|align=center|
|align=center|
|align=center|
|-bgcolor=PowderBlue
|align=center|2005–06
|align=center|3rd "C"
|align=center bgcolor=silver|2
|align=center|24
|align=center|15
|align=center|1
|align=center|8
|align=center|43
|align=center|22
|align=center|46
|align=center|
|align=center|
|align=center|
|align=center|
|-bgcolor=PowderBlue
|align=center|2006–07
|align=center|3rd "B"
|align=center|4
|align=center|28
|align=center|17
|align=center|3
|align=center|8
|align=center|36
|align=center|35
|align=center|54
|align=center|
|align=center|
|align=center|
|align=center|
|-bgcolor=PowderBlue
|align=center|2007–08
|align=center|3rd "B"
|align=center|10
|align=center|34
|align=center|12
|align=center|8
|align=center|14
|align=center|43
|align=center|62
|align=center|44
|align=center|
|align=center|
|align=center|
|align=center|
|-bgcolor=PowderBlue
|align=center|2008–09
|align=center|3rd "B"
|align=center|11
|align=center|34
|align=center|12
|align=center|8
|align=center|14
|align=center|40
|align=center|50
|align=center|44
|align=center|
|align=center|
|align=center|
|align=center|
|-bgcolor=PowderBlue
|align=center|2009–10
|align=center|3rd "B"
|align=center|12
|align=center|26
|align=center|4
|align=center|3
|align=center|19
|align=center|16
|align=center|40
|align=center|15
|align=center|
|align=center|
|align=center|
|align=center|
|-bgcolor=PowderBlue
|align=center|2010–11
|align=center|3rd "B"
|align=center|8
|align=center|22
|align=center|9
|align=center|0
|align=center|13
|align=center|20
|align=center|37
|align=center|27
|align=center|
|align=center|
|align=center|
|align=center|
|-bgcolor=PowderBlue
|align=center|2011–12
|align=center|3rd "B"
|align=center|13
|align=center|26
|align=center|5
|align=center|2
|align=center|19
|align=center|25
|align=center|47
|align=center|17
|align=center|
|align=center|
|align=center|
|align=center bgcolor=pink|Withdrew
|-
|align=center|2012–15
|align=center colspan=13|Ukrainian Premier Reserve League and U19s
|-bgcolor=PowderBlue
|align=center|2016–17
|align=center|3rd 
|align=center|12
|align=center|32 	 	
|align=center|11 	
|align=center|1 	
|align=center|20 	
|align=center|42 	
|align=center|56 	
|align=center|34 	
|align=center|
|align=center|
|align=center|
|align=center|
|-
|align=center|2017–18
|align=center colspan=13|Ukrainian Premier Reserve League and U19s
|}

Notes and references

See also
FC Mariupol

External links
 Official Illichivets-2 Team list

 
Defunct football clubs in Ukraine
Ukrainian reserve football teams
Football clubs in Mariupol
FC Mariupol
Association football clubs established in 1996
1996 establishments in Ukraine
2017 disestablishments in Ukraine
Association football clubs disestablished in 2017